"Heartbreaker" is a song by American singer Pat Benatar from her debut studio album In the Heat of the Night (1979). Written and composed by Geoff Gill and Cliff Wade, the song had first been recorded by English singer Jenny Darren on her 1978 album Queen of Fools, and Benatar adjusted the original lyrics, as such references as "A to Zed" and "moonraker" would have likely confused American listeners. 

"Heartbreaker" was the second single released off In the Heat of the Night after the first, "If You Think You Know How to Love Me", failed to reach the US Billboard Hot 100.  A sleeper hit, "Heartbreaker" proved to be Benatar's breakthrough single, reaching number 23 on the U.S Billboard Hot 100 while spending four and a half months on the chart, the fourth longest of all of her singles.  It was more popular on album-oriented rock stations as it peaked at number 13 on Tunecasters Rock Tracks chart in March 1980.  The song peaked at number 16 in Canada and at number 14 in New Zealand, although it only reached number 95 in Australia.

The song was named the 72nd best hard rock song of all time by VH1.

The song is featured as downloadable content for the music video game series Rock Band, and is a playable song for the game Guitar Hero World Tour. The song is also a playable song for the game Karaoke Revolution: Presents American Idol, as well as downloadable content for its sequel, American Idol Encore. Alvin and the Chipmunks covered the song for their 1982 album Chipmunk Rock. The tenth season premiere of Supernatural featured "Heartbreaker" in the recap montage of the previous season. Former American Idol finalist Allison Iraheta regularly covers the song as part of her set on the Glam Nation Tour. This song was also performed by Benatar and her band in the Charmed episode "Lucky Charmed." It also featured during a chase/shootout scene in the 2021 film Nobody.

Tracklisting
7"
A. "Heartbreaker" – 3:26
B. "My Clone Sleeps Alone" – 3:27

7" (Netherlands and Germany)
A. "Heartbreaker" – 3:26
B. "So Sincere" – 3:28

12" Promo (Japan)
A. "Heartbreaker" – 3:26
B. "We Live for Love" – 3:53

2009 Digital Single
 "Heartbreaker" – 3:28
 "Hit Me With Your Best Shot" – 2:52

Chart performance

Weekly charts

Year-end charts

References

External links
 
 

1978 songs
1979 singles
1980 singles
Pat Benatar songs
Song recordings produced by Mike Chapman
Alvin and the Chipmunks songs
Chrysalis Records singles